Lorraine Warren is a New Zealand academic. She is a full professor at the Massey University.

Academic career

After receiving a PhD in synthetic organic chemistry at the University of Wales in 1983, Warren moved into the field of innovation and entrepreneurship, working at Loughborough University and University of Southampton in the UK, before moving to Massey University as a full professor.

Selected works 
 Down, Simon, and Lorraine Warren. "Constructing narratives of enterprise: clichés and entrepreneurial self-identity." International Journal of Entrepreneurial Behavior & Research 14, no. 1 (2008): 4-23.
 Anderson, Alistair R., and Lorraine Warren. "The entrepreneur as hero and jester: Enacting the entrepreneurial discourse." International Small Business Journal 29, no. 6 (2011): 589–609.
 Warren, Lorraine. "Negotiating entrepreneurial identity: communities of practice and changing discourses." The International Journal of Entrepreneurship and Innovation 5, no. 1 (2004): 25–35.
 Warren, Lorraine. "A systemic approach to entrepreneurial learning: an exploration using storytelling." Systems Research and Behavioral Science: The Official Journal of the International Federation for Systems Research 21, no. 1 (2004): 3–16.

References

External links
  
 

Living people
Year of birth missing (living people)
Academic staff of the Massey University
New Zealand women academics
Academics of Loughborough University